Sayeed Pridgett (born May 22, 1998) is an American professional basketball player for Karditsa of the Greek Basket League. He played college basketball for the Montana Grizzlies.

High school career
Pridgett attended El Cerrito High School in El Cerrito, California. He was ruled ineligible for part of his first season for academic reasons. He averaged 17 points, 6.5 rebounds and 3.5 assists per game as a junior. Pridgett played for the Oakland Rebels on the Amateur Athletic Union circuit. A three-star recruit, he committed to play college basketball for Montana over offers from Oregon State, Creighton and Saint Mary's, among others.

College career
Pridgett primarily came off the bench in his first two years at Montana. As a sophomore, he averaged 8.4 points, 4.3 rebounds and 1.3 assists per game. In his junior season, he averaged 15.1 points, 4.9 rebounds, 2.2 assists and 1.3 steals per game, and was named to the First Team All-Big Sky. As a senior, Pridgett was placed in a leading role, ranking first on the team in several statistical categories. On January 25, 2020, Pridgett scored a career-high 33 points and grabbed eight rebounds in an 87-85 overtime loss to Weber State. He averaged 19.8 points, 7.2 rebounds, 3.9 assists and 1.5 steals per game, earning First Team All-Big Sky honors for the second straight year. He finished his career with the fourth-most points in program history, and the most points by a Montana player since Larry Krystkowiak (1982–86).

Professional career

Ionikos Nikaias (2020–2021)
On September 15, 2020, Pridgett signed his first professional contract with Ionikos Nikaias of the Greek Basket League. He helped the team make the playoffs after hitting a basket with 4.4 seconds remaining in an 86-85 overtime win against Kolossos Rodou.

Birmingham Squadron (2021)
On October 25, 2021, Pridgett joined the Birmingham Squadron after a successful tryout. He was waived on November 15.

Apollon Limassol (2021–2022)
Pridgett spent the rest of the 2021–2022 season with Apollon Limassol in Cyprus.

Karditsa (2022–present)
On August 23, 2022, Pridgett returned to Greece, signing with the newly promoted Karditsa.

References

External links
Montana Grizzlies bio
Twitter

1998 births
Living people
American men's basketball players
American expatriate basketball people in Cyprus
American expatriate basketball people in Greece
Shooting guards
Small forwards
Ionikos Nikaias B.C. players
Birmingham Squadron players
Montana Grizzlies basketball players
Basketball players from Oakland, California